The ICD-11 is the eleventh revision of the International Classification of Diseases (ICD). It replaces the ICD-10 as the global standard for recording health information and causes of death. The ICD is developed and annually updated by the World Health Organization (WHO). Development of the ICD-11 started in 2007 and spanned over a decade of work, involving over 300 specialists from 55 countries divided into 30 work groups, with an additional 10,000 proposals from people all over the world. Following an alpha version in May 2011 and a beta draft in May 2012, a stable version of the ICD-11 was released on 18 June 2018, and officially endorsed by all WHO members during the 72nd World Health Assembly on 25 May 2019.

The ICD-11 is a large ontology consisting of about 85,000 entities, also called classes or nodes. An entity can be anything that is relevant to health care. It usually represents a disease or a pathogen, but it can also be an isolated symptom or (developmental) anomaly of the body. There are also classes for reasons for contact with health services, social circumstances of the patient, and external causes of injury or death. The ICD-11 is part of the WHO-FIC, a family of medical classifications. The WHO-FIC contains the Foundation Component, which comprises all entities of all classifications endorsed by the WHO. The Foundation is the common core from which all classifications are derived. For example, the ICD-O is a derivative classification optimized for use in oncology. The primary derivative of the Foundation is called the ICD-11 MMS, and it is this system that is commonly referred to as simply "the ICD-11". MMS stands for Mortality and Morbidity Statistics. The ICD-11 is distributed under a Creative Commons BY-ND license.

The ICD-11 officially came into effect on 1 January 2022. On 11 February, the WHO claimed that 35 countries were using the ICD-11. In the United States, an expected implementation year of 2025 has been given, but if a clinical modification is determined to be needed (similar to the ICD-10-CM), ICD-11 implementation might not begin until 2027.

The ICD-11 MMS can be viewed online on the WHO's website. Aside from this, the site offers two maintenance platforms: the ICD-11 Maintenance Platform, and the WHO-FIC Foundation Maintenance Platform. Users can submit evidence-based suggestions for the improvement of the WHO-FIC, i.e. the ICD-11, the ICF, and the ICHI.

Structure

WHO-FIC

The WHO Family of International Classifications (WHO-FIC), also called the WHO Family, is a suit of classifications used to describe various aspects of the health care system in a consistent manner, with a standardised terminology. The abbreviation is variously written with or without a hyphen ("WHO-FIC" or "WHOFIC"). The WHO-FIC consists of four components: the WHO-FIC Foundation, the Reference Classifications, the Derived Classifications, and the Related Classifications. The WHO-FIC Foundation, also called the Foundation Component, represents the entire WHO-FIC universe. It is a collection of over hundred thousand entities, also called classes or nodes. Entities are anything relevant to health care. They are used to describe diseases, disorders, body parts, bodily functions, reasons for visit, medical procedures, microbes, causes of death, social circumstances of the patient, and much more.

The Foundation Component is a multidimensional collection of entities. An entity can have multiple parents and child nodes. For example, pneumonia can be categorized as a lung infection, but also as a bacterial or viral infection (i.e. by site or by etiology). Thus, the node Pneumonia has two parents: Lung infections and Certain infectious or parasitic diseases. The Pneumonia node in turn has various children, including Bacterial pneumonia and Viral pneumonia.

The Foundation Component is the common core on which all Reference and Derived Classifications are based. The WHO-FIC contains three Reference Classifications: the ICD-11 MMS (see below), the ICF, and the ICHI. Derived Classifications are based on the three Reference Classifications, and are usually tailored for a particular specialty. For example, the ICD-O is a Derived Classification used in oncology. Each node of the Foundation has a unique entity id, which remains the same in all Reference and Derived Classifications, guaranteeing consistency. Related Classifications are complementary, and cover specialty areas not covered elsewhere in the WHO-FIC. For example, the International Classification of Nursing Practice (ICNP), draws on terms from the Foundation Component, but also uses terms specific for nursing not found in the Foundation.

A classification can be represented as a tabular list, which is a "flat" hierarchical tree of categories. In this tree, all entities can only have a single parent, and therefore must be mutually exclusive of each other. Such a classification is also called a linearization.

ICD-11 MMS
The ICD-11 MMS is the main Reference Classification of the WHO-FIC, and the primary linearization of the Foundation Component. The ICD-11 MMS is commonly referred to as simply "the ICD-11". The "MMS" was added to differentiate the ICD-11 entities in the Foundation from those in the Classification. The ICD-11 MMS does not contain all classes from the Foundation ICD-11, and also adds some classes from the ICF. MMS stands for Mortality and Morbidity Statistics. The abbreviation is variously written with or without a hyphen between 11 and MMS ("ICD-11 MMS" or "ICD-11-MMS").

The ICD-11 MMS consists of approximately 85,000 entities. Entities can be chapters, blocks or categories. A chapter is a top level entity of the hierarchy; the MMS contains 28 of them (see Chapters section below). A block is used to group related categories or blocks together. A category can be anything that is relevant to health care. Every category has a unique, alphanumeric code called an ICD-11 code, or just ICD code. Chapters and blocks never have ICD-11 codes, and therefore cannot be diagnosed. An ICD-11 code is not the same as an entity id.

The ICD-11 MMS takes the form of a "flat" hierarchical tree. As aforementioned, the entities in this linearization can only have a single parent, and therefore must be mutually exclusive of each other. To make up for this limitation, the hierarchy of the MMS contains gray nodes. These nodes appear as children in the hierarchy, but actually have a different parent node. They originally belong to a different block or chapter, but are also listed elsewhere because of overlap. For example, Pneumonia has two parents in the Foundation: "Lung infections" (site) and "Certain infectious or parasitic diseases" (etiology). In the MMS, Pneumonia is categorized in the "Lung infections", with a gray node in "Certain infectious or parasitic diseases". The same goes for injuries, poisonings, neoplasms, and developmental anomalies, which can occur in almost any part of the body. They each have their own chapters, but their categories also have gray nodes in the chapters of the organs they affect. For instance, the blood cancers, including all forms of leukemia, are in the "Neoplasms" chapter, but they are also displayed as gray nodes in the chapter "Diseases of the blood or blood-forming organs".

The ICD-11 MMS also contains residual categories, or residual nodes. These are the "Other specified" and "Unspecified" categories, miscellaneous classes which can be used to code conditions that do not fit with any of the more specific MMS entities. In the ICD-11 Browser, residual nodes are displayed in a maroon color. Residual categories are not in the Foundation, and therefore are the only classes with derivative entity IDs: their IDs are the same as their parent nodes, with "/mms/otherspecified" or "/mms/unspecified" tagged at the end. Their ICD codes always end with Y for "Other specified" categories, or Z for "Unspecified" categories (e.g.  and ).

Health informatics
The ICD-11, both the ICD-11 Foundation and the MMS, can be accessed using a multilingual REST API. Documentation on the ICD API and some additional tools for integration into third-party applications can be found at the ICD API home page.

The WHO has released a map that can be used to link and convert ICD-10 terms to those of the ICD-11. It can be downloaded from the ICD-11 MMS browser. In 2017, SNOMED International announced plans to release a SNOMED CT to ICD-11 MMS map.

The ICD-11 Foundation, and consequently the MMS, are updated annually, similarly to the ICD-10. , six versions of the Foundation and MMS have been released.

Chapters
Below is a list of all chapters of the ICD-11 MMS, the primary linearization of the Foundation Component.

Unlike the ICD-10 codes, the ICD-11 MMS codes never contain the letters I or O, to prevent confusion with the numbers 1 and 0.

Changes
Below is a summary of notable changes in the ICD-11 MMS compared to the ICD-10.

General
The ICD-11 MMS features a more flexible coding structure. In the ICD-10, every code starts with a letter, indicating the chapter. This is followed by a two digit number (e.g. ), creating 99 slots per chapter, excluding subcategories and blocks. This proved enough for most chapters, but four are so voluminous that they span two letters: chapter 1 (A00–B99), chapter 2 (C00.0–D48.9), chapter 19 (S00–T98), and chapter 20 (V01–Y98). In the ICD-11 MMS, there is a single first character for every chapter. The codes of the first nine chapters begin with the numbers 1 to 9, while the next nineteen chapters start with the letters A to X. The letters I and O are not used, to prevent confusion with the numbers 1 and 0. The chapter character is then followed by a letter, a number, and a fourth character that starts as a number (0–9, e.g. ) and may then continue as a letter (A–Z, e.g. ). The WHO opted for a forced number as the third character to prevent the spelling of "undesirable words". In the ICD-10, each entity within a chapter either has a code (e.g. ) or a code range (e.g. ). The latter is a block. In the ICD-11 MMS, blocks never have codes, and not every entity necessarily has a code, although each entity does have a unique id.

In the ICD-10, the next level of the hierarchy is indicated in the code by a dot and a single number (e.g. ). This is the lowest available level in the ICD-10 hierarchy, causing an artificial limitation of 10 subcategories per code (.0 to .9). In the ICD-11 MMS, this limitation no longer exists: after 0–9, the list may continue with A–Z (e.g.  – ). Then, following the first character after the dot, a second character may be used in the next level of the hierarchy (e.g.  – ). This level is currently the lowest appearing in the MMS. The large amount of unused coding space in the MMS allows for updates to be made without having to change the other categories, ensuring that codes remain stable.

The ICD-11 features five new chapters. The third chapter of the ICD-10, "Diseases of the blood and blood-forming organs and certain disorders involving the immune mechanism", has been split in two: "Diseases of the blood or blood-forming organs" (chapter 3) and "Diseases of the immune system" (chapter 4). The other new chapters are "Sleep-wake disorders" (chapter 7), "Conditions related to sexual health" (chapter 17, see section), and "Supplementary Chapter Traditional Medicine Conditions - Module I" (chapter 26, see section).

Mental disorders

Overview
The following mental disorders have been newly added to the ICD-11, but were already included in the American ICD-10-CM adaption: Binge eating disorder, Bipolar type II disorder, Body dysmorphic disorder, Excoriation disorder, Frotteuristic disorder, Hoarding disorder, and Intermittent explosive disorder.

The following mental disorders have been newly added to the ICD-11, and are not in the ICD-10-CM: Avoidant/restrictive food intake disorder, Body integrity dysphoria, Catatonia, Complex post-traumatic stress disorder, Gaming disorder, Olfactory reference disorder, and Prolonged grief disorder.

Other notable changes include:

 Distinct personality disorders have been collapsed into a single Personality disorder diagnosis, using a dimensional (as opposed to categorical) model; see Personality disorders section.
 All subtypes of Schizophrenia (e.g. paranoid, hebephrenic, catatonic) have been removed. Instead, a dimensional model is used with the category Symptomatic manifestations of primary psychotic disorders, which allows the coding for Positive symptoms, Negative symptoms, Depressive symptoms, Manic symptoms, Psychomotor symptoms, and Cognitive symptoms.
 Persistent mood disorders, which consists of Cyclothymia and Dysthymia, have been deleted.
 The ICD-10 differentiates between Phobic anxiety disorders, such as Agoraphobia, and Other anxiety disorders, such as Generalized anxiety disorder. The ICD-11 merges both groups together as Anxiety or fear-related disorders.
 All Pervasive developmental disorders are merged into one category, Autism spectrum disorder, except for Rett syndrome, which is moved to the developmental anomalies chapter.
 Hyperkinetic disorders is renamed Attention deficit hyperactivity disorder, and a distinction in subtypes is made between predominantly inattentive, predominantly hyperactive-impulsive, and combined. Hyperkinetic conduct disorder has been removed.
 Acute stress reaction has been moved out of the mental disorder chapter, and placed in the chapter "Factors influencing health status or contact with health services". Thus, in the ICD-11, Acute stress reaction is no longer considered a mental disorder.

Aside from the updates made for the ICD-11, the WHO has developed an ICD-11 subset of the Clinical descriptions and diagnostic guidelines (CDDG), although it has not yet been published. A book of the same name was released in 1992 for the ICD-10, which was also known as the "Blue Book". It contains expanded definitions and diagnostic criteria for the mental disorders, whereas the ICD-10/-11 mental disorders chapters contain only short summaries. The ICD chapters are meant as a quick reference point, whereas the CDDG is meant for extensive diagnosing by health care professionals. To differentiate the old and the new version, the newest revision is called the ICD-11 CDDG. The WHO described the development of the ICD-11 CDDG as "the most global, multilingual, multidisciplinary and participative revision process ever implemented for a classification of mental disorders", involving nearly 15,000 clinicians from 155 countries. , the WHO has not made the ICD-11 CDDG publicly available.

Personality disorder
The personality disorder (PD) section has been completely revamped. All distinct PDs have been merged into one: Personality disorder, which can be coded as Mild, Moderate, Severe, or severity unspecified. There is also an additional category called Personality difficulty, which can be used to describe personality traits that are problematic, but do not rise to the level of a PD. A personality disorder or difficulty can be specified by one or more Prominent personality traits or patterns. The ICD-11 uses five trait domains: (1) Negative affectivity; (2) Detachment, (3) Dissociality, (4) Disinhibition, and (5) Anankastia. Listed directly underneath is Borderline pattern, a category similar to Borderline personality disorder. This is not a trait in itself, but a combination of the five traits in certain severity.

Described as a clinical equivalent to the Big Five model, the five-trait system addresses several problems of the old category-based system. Of the ten PDs in the ICD-10, two were used with a disproportionate high frequency: Emotionally unstable personality disorder, borderline type and Dissocial (antisocial) personality disorder. Many categories overlapped, and individuals with severe disorders often met the requirements for multiple PDs, which Reed et al. (2019) described as "artificial comorbidity". PD was therefore reconceptualized in terms of a general dimension of severity, focusing on five negative personality traits which a person can have to various degrees.

There was considerable debate regarding this new dimensional model, with many believing that categorical diagnosing should not be abandoned. In particular, there was disagreement about the status of Borderline personality disorder. Reed (2018) wrote: "Some research suggests that borderline PD is not an independently valid category, but rather a heterogeneous marker for PD severity. Other researchers view borderline PD as a valid and distinct clinical entity, and claim that 50 years of research support the validity of the category. Many – though by no means all – clinicians appear to be aligned with the latter position. In the absence of more definitive data, there seemed to be little hope of accommodating these opposing views. However, the WHO took seriously the concerns being expressed that access to services for patients with borderline PD, which has increasingly been achieved in some countries based on arguments of treatment efficacy, might be seriously undermined." Thus, the WHO believed the inclusion of a Borderline pattern category to be a "pragmatic compromise".

The Alternative DSM-5 Model for Personality Disorders (AMPD) included near the end of the DSM-5 is similar to the PD-system of the ICD-11, although much larger and more comprehensive. It was considered for inclusion in the ICD-11, but the WHO decided against it because it was considered "too complicated for implementation in most clinical settings around the world", since an explicit aim of the WHO was to develop a simple and efficient method that could also be used in low-resource settings.

Gaming disorder
Gaming disorder has been newly added to the ICD-11, and placed in the group "Disorders due to addictive behaviours", alongside Gambling disorder. The latter was called Pathological gambling in the ICD-10. Aside from Gaming disorder, the ICD-11 also features Hazardous gaming, an ancillary category that can be used to identify problematic gaming which does not rise to the level of a disorder.

Although a majority of scholars supported the inclusion of Gaming disorder (GD), a significant number did not. Aarseth et al. (2017) stated that the evidence base which this decision relied upon is of low quality, that the diagnostic criteria of gaming disorder are rooted in substance use and gambling disorder even though they are not the same, that no consensus exist on the definition and assessment of GD, and that a pre-defined category would lock research in a confirmatory approach. Rooij et al. (2017) questioned if what was called "gaming disorder" is in fact a coping strategy for underlying problems, such as depression, social anxiety, or ADHD. They also asserted moral panic, fueled by sensational media stories, and stated that the category could be stigmatizing people who are simply engaging in a very immersive hobby. Bean et al. (2017) wrote that the GD category caters to false stereotypes of gamers as physically unfit and socially awkward, and that most gamers have no problems balancing their expected social roles outside games with those inside.

In support of the GD category, Lee et al. (2017) agreed that there were major limitations of the existing research, but that this actually necessitates a standardized set of criteria, which would benefit studies more than self-developed instruments for evaluating problematic gaming. Saunders et al. (2017) argued that gaming addiction should be in the ICD-11 just as much as gambling addiction and substance addiction, citing functional neuroimaging studies which show similar brain regions being activated, and psychological studies which show similar antecedents (risk factors). Király and Demetrovics (2017) did not believe that a GD category would lock research into a confirmatory approach, noting that the ICD is regularly revised and characterized by permanent change. They wrote that moral panic around gamers does indeed exist, but that this is not caused by a formal diagnosis. Rumpf et al. (2018) noted that stigmatization is a risk not specific to GD alone. They agreed that GD could be a coping strategy for an underlying disorder, but that in this debate, "comorbidity is more often the rule than the exception". For example, a person can have an alcohol dependence due to PTSD. In clinical practice, both disorders need to be diagnosed and treated. Rumpf et al. also warned that the lack of a GD category might jeopardize insurance reimbursement of treatments.

The DSM-5 (2013) features a similar category called Internet Gaming Disorder (IGD). However, due to the controversy over its definition and inclusion, it is not included in its main body of mental diagnoses, but in the additional chapter "Conditions for Further Study". Disorders in this chapter are meant to encourage research and are not intended to be officially diagnosed.

Burn-out
In May 2019, a number of media incorrectly reported that burn-out was newly added to the ICD-11. In reality, burn-out is also in the ICD-10, albeit with a short, one-sentence definition only. The ICD-11 features a longer summary, and specifically notes that the category should only be used in an occupational context. Furthermore, it should only be applied when mood disorders, Disorders specifically associated with stress, and Anxiety or fear-related disorders have been ruled out.

As with the ICD-10, burn-out is not in the mental disorders chapter, but in the chapter "Factors influencing health status or contact with health services", where it is coded . In response to media attention over its inclusion, the WHO emphasized that the ICD-11 does not define burn-out as a mental disorder or a disease, but as an occupational phenomenon that undermines a person's well-being in the workplace.

Sexual health
Conditions related to sexual health is a new chapter in the ICD-11. The WHO decided to put the sexual disorders in a separate chapter due to "the outdated mind/body split". A number of ICD-10 categories, including sex disorders, were based on a Cartesian separation of "organic" (physical) and "non-organic" (mental) conditions. As such, the sexual dysfunctions that were considered non-organic were included in the mental disorder chapter, while those that were considered organic were for the most part listed in the chapter on diseases of the genitourinary system. In the ICD-11, the brain and the body are seen as an integrate whole, with sexual dysfunctions considered to involve an interaction between physical and psychological factors. Thus, the organic/non-organic distinction was abolished.

Sexual dysfunctions
Regarding general sexual dysfunction, the ICD-10 has three main categories: Lack or loss of sexual desire, Sexual aversion and lack of sexual enjoyment, and Failure of genital response. The ICD-11 replaces these with two main categories: Hypoactive sexual desire dysfunction and Sexual arousal dysfunction. The latter has two subcategories: Female sexual arousal dysfunction and Male erectile dysfunction. The difference between Hypoactive sexual desire dysfunction and Sexual arousal dysfunction is that in the former, there is a reduced or absent desire for sexual activity. In the latter, there is insufficient physical and emotional response to sexual activity, even though there still is a desire to engage in satisfying sex. The WHO acknowledged that there is an overlap between desire and arousal, but they are not the same. Management should focus on their distinct features.

The ICD-10 contains the categories Vaginismus, Nonorganic vaginismus, Dyspareunia, and Nonorganic dyspareunia. As the WHO aimed to steer away from the aforementioned "outdated mind/body split", the organic and nonorganic disorders were merged. Vaginismus has been reclassified as sexual pain-penetration disorder. Dyspareunia has been retained. A related condition is Vulvodynia, which is in the ICD-9, but not in the ICD-10. It has been re-added to the ICD-11.

Sexual dysfunctions and Sexual pain-penetration disorder can be coded alongside a temporal qualifier, "lifelong" or "acquired", and a situational qualifier, "general" or "situational". Furthermore, the ICD-11 offers five aetiological qualifiers, or "Associated with..." categories, to further specify the diagnosis. For example, a woman who experiences sexual problems due to adverse effects of an SSRI antidepressant may be diagnosed with "Female sexual arousal dysfunction, acquired, generalised" combined with "Associated with use of psychoactive substance or medication".

Compulsive sexual behaviour disorder
Excessive sexual drive from the ICD-10 has been reclassified as Compulsive sexual behaviour disorder (CSBD) and listed under Impulse control disorders. The WHO was unwilling to overpathologize sexual behaviour, stating that having a high sexual drive is not necessarily a disorder, so long as these people do not exhibit impaired control over their behavior, significant distress, or impairment in functioning. Kraus et al. (2018) noted that several people self-identify as "sex addicts", but on closer examination do not actually exhibit the clinical characteristics of a sexual disorder, although they may have other mental health problems, such as anxiety or depression. Experiencing shame and guilt about sex is not a reliable indicator of a sex disorder, Kraus et al. stated.

There was debate on whether CSBD should be considered a (behavioral) addiction. It has been claimed that neuroimaging shows overlap between compulsive sexual behavior and substance-use disorder through common neurotransmitter systems. Nonetheless, it was ultimately decided to place the disorder in the Impulse control disorders group. Kraus et al. wrote that, for the ICD-11, "a relatively conservative position has been recommended, recognizing that we do not yet have definitive information on whether the processes involved in the development and maintenance of [CSBD] are equivalent to those observed in substance use disorders, gambling and gaming".

Paraphilic disorders
Paraphilic disorders, called Disorders of sexual preference in the ICD-10, have remained in the mental disorders chapter, although they have gray nodes in the sexual health chapter. The ICD-10 categories Fetishism and Fetishistic transvestism were removed because, if they don't cause distress or harm, they are not considered mental disorders. Frotteuristic disorder has been newly added.

Gender incongruence
Transgenderism and gender dysphoria are called Gender incongruence in the ICD-11. In the ICD-10, the group Gender identity disorders consisted of three main categories: Transsexualism, Dual-role transvestism, and Gender identity disorder of childhood. In the ICD-11, Dual-role transvestism was deleted due to a lack of public health or clinical relevance. Transsexualism was renamed Gender incongruence of adolescence or adulthood, and Gender identity disorder of childhood was renamed Gender incongruence of childhood.

In the ICD-10, the Gender identity disorders were placed in the mental disorders chapter, following what was customary at the time. Throughout the 20th century, both the ICD and the DSM approached transgender health from a psychopathological position, as transgender identity presents a discrepancy between someone's assigned sex and their gender identity. Since this may cause mental distress, it was consequently considered a mental disorder, with distress or discomfort being a core diagnostic feature. In the 2000s and 2010s, this notion became increasingly challenged, as the idea of viewing transgender people as having a mental disorder was believed by some to be stigmatizing. It has been suggested that distress and dysfunction among transgender people should be more appropriately viewed as the result of social rejection, discrimination, and violence toward individuals with gender variant appearance and behavior. Studies have shown transgender people to be at higher risk of developing mental health problems than other populations, but that health services aimed at transgender people are often insufficient or nonexistent. Since an official ICD code is usually needed to gain access to and reimbursement for therapy, the WHO found it ill-advised to remove transgender health from the ICD-11 altogether. It was therefore decided to transpose the concept from the mental disorders chapter to the new sexual health chapter.

Antimicrobial resistance and GLASS
Also, the ICD-11 codes are more closely in line with the WHO's Global Antimicrobial Resistance Surveillance System (GLASS). Launched in October 2015, this project aims to track the worldwide immunity of malicious microbes (viruses, bacteria, fungi, and protozoa) against medication.

Traditional medicine
"Supplementary Chapter Traditional Medicine Conditions - Module I" is an additional chapter in the ICD-11. It consists of concepts that are commonly referred to as Traditional Chinese Medicine (TCM), although the WHO prefers to use the more general and neutral sounding term Traditional Medicine (TM). Many of the traditional therapies and medicines that originally came from China also have long histories of usage and development in Japan (Kampo), Korea (TKM), and Vietnam (TVM). Medical procedures that can be labeled as "traditional" continue to be used all over the world, and are an integral part of health services in some countries. A 2008 survey by the WHO found that "[i]n some Asian and African countries, 80% of the population depend on traditional medicine for primary health care". Also, "[i]n many developed countries, 70% to 80% of the population has used some form of alternative or complementary medicine (e.g. acupuncture)".

From approximately 2003 to 2007, a group of experts from various countries developed the WHO International Standard Terminologies on Traditional Medicine in the Western Pacific Region, or simply IST. In the following years, based on this nomenclature, the group created the International Classification of Traditional Medicine, or ICTM. , Module I, also called TM1, is the only module of the ICTM to have been released. Morris, Gomes, & Allen (2012) have stated that Module II will cover Ayurveda, that Module III will cover homeopathy, and that Module IV will cover "other TM systems with independent diagnostic conditions in a similar fashion". However, these modules have yet to be made public, and Singh & Rastogi (2018) noted that this "keeps the speculations open for what actually is encompassing under the current domain [of the ICTM]".

The decision to include T(C)M in the ICD-11 has been criticized, because it is often alleged to be pseudoscience. Editorials by Nature and Scientific American admitted that some TM techniques and herbs have shown effectiveness or potential, but that others are pointless, or even outright harmful. They wrote that the inclusion of the TM-chapter is at odds with the scientific, evidence-based methods usually employed by the WHO. Both editorials accused the government of China of pushing the WHO to incorporate TCM, a global, billion-dollar market in which China plays a leading role. The WHO has stated that the categories of TM1 "do not refer to – or endorse – any form of treatment", and that their inclusion is primarily intended for statistical purposes. The TM1 codes are recommended to be used in conjunction with the Western Medicine concepts of ICD-11 chapters 1-25.

Other changes
Other notable changes in the ICD-11 include:

 Stroke is now classified as a neurological disorder instead of a disease of the circulatory system.
 Allergies are now coded under diseases of the immune system.
 In the ICD-10, a distinction was made between Sleep disorders, included in nervous system diseases chapter, and Nonorganic sleep disorders, included in the mental disorders chapter. In the ICD-11, they are merged and placed into a new chapter called Sleep-wake disorders, since the separation between organic (physical) and non-organic (mental) disorders is considered obsolete.
 "Supplementary section for functioning assessment" is an additional chapter that provides codes for use in the WHO Disability Assessment Schedule 2.0 (WHODAS 2.0), the Model Disability Survey (MDS), and the ICF.

Footnotes

References

External links
 WHO-FIC Classifications and Terminologies
 WHO-FIC Maintenance Platform
 ICD-11 Home Page
 ICD-11 for Mortality and Morbidity Statistics browser (ICD-11 for MMS)

International Classification of Diseases
2022 introductions